The 2013 Omloop van het Hageland was the ninth running of the women's Omloop van het Hageland, a women's bicycle race in Belgium. It was held on 3 March 2013 over a distance of  around Tielt-Winge. It was rated by the UCI as a 1.2 category race. The race was part of the 2013 Lotto Cycling Cup.

Results

s.t. = same time
Source

References

External links
 Official website

Omloop van het Hageland
Omloop van het Hageland
Omloop van het Hageland